Cor is a common Dutch given name. Its most commonly a masculine name, short for Cornelis (or rarely Cornelius), but also occurs as a feminine name, short for Cornelia. People with the name include:

Masculine name
Cor Bakker (1918–2011), Dutch racing cyclist
Cor Bakker (born 1961), Dutch pianist
Cor Blekemolen (1894–1972), Dutch racing cyclist
Cor Blommers (1901–1983), Dutch boxer
Cor Boonstra (born 1938), Dutch businessman, CEO of Philips
Cor Braasem (1923–2009), Dutch water polo player 
Cor Brom (1932–2008), Dutch football player and manager
Cor Dam (born 1935), Dutch sculptor, painter, illustrator and ceramist
Cor van Dijkum (born 1950), Dutch sociologist
Cor Dillen (1920–2009), Dutch businessman, Director of Philips in South America
Cor Edskes (1925–2015), Dutch historian and organ restorator
Cor van Eesteren (1897–1988), Dutch architect and urban planner
Cor Euser (born 1957), Dutch racing driver
Cor Fuhler (1964–2020), Dutch-Australian experimental musician
Cor van der Gijp (born 1931), Dutch footballer
Cor Gillis (born 1989), Belgian footballer
Cor Gorter (1907–1980), Dutch physicist
Cor Groot (1909–1978), Dutch Olympic sailor
Cor de Groot (1914–1993), Dutch pianist and composer
Cor van der Hart (1928–2006), Dutch footballer
Cor Heeren (1900–1976), Dutch racing cyclist
Cor Hemmers (born 1956), Dutch kickboxing trainer
Cor Herkströter (born 1937), Dutch businessman, CEO of Royal Dutch Shell
Cor van den Heuvel (born 1931), American haiku poet, editor and archivist
Cor van der Hoeven (1921–2017), Dutch footballer
Cor van Hout (1957–2003), Dutch kidnapper
Cor de Jager (1925–2001), Dutch general and chairman of the NATO Military Committee
 (1900–1971), Dutch organist and composer
Cor Kools (1907–1985), Dutch football player and manager
Cor Lambregts (born 1958), Dutch long-distance runner
Cor Melchers (1954–2015), Dutch painter
Cor Pot (born 1951), Dutch football player and manager
Cor Schilder (born 1941), Dutch Roman Catholic bishop in Kenya
Cor Schuuring (born 1942), Dutch racing cyclist
Cor Tabak (1907–2001), Dutch weightlifter
Cor Varkevisser (born 1982), Dutch footballer
Cor Veldhoen (1939–2005), Dutch footballer
Cor Verwoerd (1913–2000), Dutch ceramist
Cor Visser (1903–1982), Dutch painter active in England
Cor Vriend (born 1949), Dutch long-distance runner
 (1911–1994), Dutch track cyclist and nazi collaborator
Cor Zegger (1897–1961), Dutch swimmer

Feminine name
Cor Aalten (1913–1991), Dutch sprinter
Cor van Gelder (1904–1969), Dutch swimmer
Cor Kint (1920–2002), Dutch swimmer

Fictional characters
Shasta (Narnia), later known as Cor of Archenland, in C. S. Lewis's Chronicles of Narnia.

See also
Cor (disambiguation)
Corrie (given name)

Unisex given names
Dutch masculine given names
Dutch feminine given names
Hypocorisms